Salvia canariensis, the Canary Island sage, is an erect perennial shrub native to the Canary Islands. It can reach 2.0–2.3 m in height and 1.5 m width in a single season. The hastate leaves are pale green, and the stems and underside of the  leaves are covered with long white hairs. The flowers range from pale purple to deep purple magenta.

References

canariensis
Flora of the Canary Islands
Plants described in 1753
Taxa named by Carl Linnaeus